Alblas is a Dutch surname. Notable people with the surname include:

 Aart Alblas (1918–1944), Dutch navy officer
 Norbert Alblas (born 1994), Dutch footballer
 Ton Alblas (1940–2015), Dutch politician

References 

Dutch-language surnames